The University Of Development Alternative (UODA) is a private university in Bangladesh.

History 
This idea was founded and initiated by the president of UODA, Professor Mujib Khan. In 2002 the Government of Bangladesh approved the University of Development Alternative (UODA), and now under 6 faculties, UODA offers undergraduate courses in over 14 subjects. The students can also achieve their master's degree in their respective subjects after their respective 4 years undergraduate programmes. Its temporary campuses are in Dhanmondi, Dhaka, Bangladesh.

Background
A group of individuals formed a non-profit and non-political social organization, the Student Welfare Organization of Bangladesh (SWOB) in 1978 for guiding the youth. To achieve SWOB's mission, the College of Development Alternative (CODA) was founded in 1992 and the School of Development Alternative (SODA) in 1996. The University of Development Alternative started its journey in 2002. The three institutions embody the original vision of a system of Complete Education for Alternative Development (CEFAD), imparting technical and social education from childhood to maturity.

In 2002 the government of Bangladesh approved the University Of Development Alternative (UODA). Under four faculties, UODA offers four-year honors degrees in 14 subjects. The university also facilitates post graduate education (Master's).

Academic collaboration

Accreditation and academic collaboration 
UODA is accredited by the Universities Grants Commission (UGC), Dhaka, Bangladesh. Efforts are on going to expand academic collaboration through exchange programmes and mutual accreditation with leading universities of the world.

Scope 
UODA has the authority, under its charter, to confer degrees on the students, both at the undergraduate and graduate levels, in all faculties of Arts and Sciences including the fields of Engineering, Law, Agriculture and Medicine. It also has the authority to grant diplomas, certificates and other academic distinctions. Currently UODA offers Bachelors and master's degrees in a large number of disciplines.

List of vice-chancellors 
 Prof. Dr. Rafiqul Islam Sharif ( present )

Schools

School of Arts
 Department of English offers a bachelor's degree
 Department of Fine Arts offers a bachelor's degree, BFA and a master's degree (MFA) 
 Department of Music
 Department of Bengali (Bangla)
 Department of Mathematics
 Department of Law and Human Rights
 Department of Communication and Media Studies (CMS) offers a bachelor's degree
 Department of English

School of Life Science
The School of Life Science is the largest faculty. The departments are:
The Department of Biotechnology and Genetic Engineering 
Department  of  Molecular Medicine and Bioinformatics (MMB)
Department of Pharmacy

School of Engineering and Communication
 Department of Computer Science and Engineering (CSE) offers a bachelor's degree
 Department of Electronics and Telecommunication Engineering (ETE) offers a bachelor's degree
 Department of Mathematics (BSc Math) offers a bachelor's degree
 Department of Statistics
 Department of Chemistry and Chemical Technology
 Department of Physics and Electronics

School of Social Science
 Department of International Relations
 Department of Politics and Development
 Department of Economics
 Department of Communication and Media Stuides

School of Business Administration
 Department of Business Administration (BBA, MBA)

Majors
 Marketing
 Finance
 Human Resource Management (HRM)

References

External links
 UODA Official Website

Dhanmondi
Private universities in Bangladesh
Educational institutions established in 2002
2002 establishments in Bangladesh
Universities and colleges in Dhaka